Libera Università Internazionale degli Studi Sociali "Guido Carli" (Italian for Free International University of Social Studies "Guido Carli"), known by the acronym "LUISS" or "LUISS Guido Carli", is a  private university located in Rome, Italy, founded in 1974 by a group of entrepreneurs led by Umberto Agnelli, brother of Gianni Agnelli.

It provides undergraduate and post-graduate education, in addition to a range of Double Degree programs, in the fields of finance, business, management, law and political science. It is located near the historical center of the city, between the neighborhoods of Parioli and Trieste.
The university is supported by Confindustria, the Italian confederation of industries. Luiss has four different campuses: one in Viale Romania, one in Via Parenzo, one in Villa Blanc and the last one in Viale Pola. It also has a library in Via Santa Costanza.

History
In 1974 a group of entrepreneurs led by Umberto Agnelli (the brother of Gianni Agnelli, who at the time was president of Confindustria), launched a project investing economic and intellectual resources in the establishment of a university. This university would be designed to offer undergraduate and post-graduate education that is geared towards the needs of the market.

Luiss came out of a pre-existing university, (Pro Deo University, founded in 1966), which was redesigned and renamed Luiss (an acronym for Libera Università Internazionale degli Studi Sociali, which means "Free International University of Social Studies") in 1977. Eventually, other public and private industrial groups, as well as some banks, joined the founders.

The group of businessmen and bankers who had promoted and financed the birth of the project, as well as the transformation of the organization of the old Pro Deo University, into the more modern ones of Luiss University, as it is today, was established in 1985 in the current “Friends of Luiss”. This has had since its inception the Senator Umberto Agnelli as its president, who was then succeeded by Francesco Gaetano Caltagirone (still in office), and plays a vital role in the collection and distribution of economic resources to be allocated to provide scholarships for students who have enormous potential but a lack of economic resources, and to ensure that the most brilliant Luiss graduates have the possibility of earning PhDs to dedicate themselves to scientific research with a view to an academic career or advanced professional activities.

Guido Carli, former Governor of the Banca d'Italia, President of Confindustria and later Senator was President of Luiss from 1978 until his death in 1993. His work was so highly esteemed that in 1994 the university changed its name to Luiss Guido Carli.

Originally the university had only the faculties of Economics and Political Science, to which was added the faculty of Law in 1982. In 2011 an academic reorganization took place, which resulted in today's four Departments: Law, Business and Management, Economics and Finance, and Political Science. Today the university offers many courses entirely taught in English, such as 'Economics & Business' or 'Politics, Philosophy and Economics'.

Rankings
Luiss ranks among the top 100 European Business Schools, as stated by the Financial Times official ranking.

In 2013, the Censis annual university ranking done in conjunction with the newspaper la Repubblica, ranked Luiss Guido Carli first for Political Science and second for Law and Economics among medium size private universities in Italy.

With regard to research output, according to the final report on research quality for 2004/2010 from ANVUR, the university ranked second (in Italy overall, for all disciplines) among small universities, tying with the Scuola Normale Superiore di Pisa and behind the Sant'Anna School of Advanced Studies.

In 2015, Luiss ranked second in the parent Confindustria owned Il Sole 24 Ore annual national ranking.

In 2016, Luiss ranked first in the parent Confindustria owned Il Sole 24 Ore annual national ranking.

In 2022, Luiss enters the top 100 universities in the world for social sciences (according to the QS ranking by subject):
Luiss climbed 200 positions in five years.
The university is ranked 1st for political sciences in Italy and 22nd in the world.
Luiss entered the top 100 universities in the for law, business and management studies.

In late 2022, according to the Financial Times Master's in Management 2022 rankings, the university remains in the top 100 for all indicators and has moved up more than 20 places in one year, ranking 53rd.

Admission 
To attend a degree program at one of the four Departments at Luiss, candidates must pass an admission test. Each year a maximum number of places available is set and the admission test is done in two different sessions (one in February and one in May), after which a ranking by session is drafted, where each student has a score made up of their final grade in secondary school and their test score. Admission is obviously based on the available slots and where selected students choose not to attend, other students are selected from the waiting list.

The admission test lasts 90 minutes and is made up of 100 multiple-choice questions measuring general culture (15%) and aptitude (85%). The subjects on the test are: logic and reading comprehension; logical and mathematical aptitude and financial mathematics; numerical and spatial logic; abstract reasoning and critical/verbal skills; knowledge of general math and general culture (current events, history, literature, philosophy); and English.

On average, candidates admitted to Luiss are high achievers: 68.1% of students have a final secondary school average of over 90/100, compared to the national average of 24.6%.

To be admitted to a master's degree, Luiss graduates with degree grades of 100 or above can be admitted to degree programs without having to take an admission test, until all the available slots are taken. Graduates from other universities (for a maximum of 250) must take a written test to apply for admission.

Organization 
The university is divided into the following four departments:

Department of Law 
The academic organization provides a single five-year cycle for the combined bachelor's and master's degree program in Law (Category: LGM/01).

Department of Business and Management 
The Department of Business and Management offers the following degree programs:
 Bachelor’s degree in Economics and Management (category L-18);
Bachelor's degree in Management and Computer Science (category L-18);
 Master’s degree in Business Management (category LM-77);
 Master’s degree in Management in English (category LM-77);
 Master’s degree in Accounting, Finance and Control (category LM-77);
Master's degree in Marketing (category LM-77);
Master's degree in Corporate Finance (category LM-77);
Master's degree in Global Management and Politics (category LM-77);

Department of Economics and Finance 
The Department of Economics and Finance offers the following degree programs:
 Bachelor’s degree in Economics and Business (category L-33);
 Master’s degree in Economics and Finance (category LM-56)

Department of Political Science 
The Department of Political Science offers the following degree programs:
 Bachelor’s degree in Politics, philosophy and economics (category L-36);
 Master’s degree in International Relations (category LM-62);
 Master’s degree in Government and Policies (category LM-62)

Postgraduate degrees 
The university has several autonomous postgraduate schools:

LUISS Business School, a school for professional management and a center of research and management consulting. It has its own MBA program, various types of master's degrees and ad hoc training courses for business customers;

LUISS School of Government which offers specific training, through the provision of four different master's degrees in the field of political processes and decision-making, both in the public and private sector;

The Specialized School for the Legal Professions offers two-year programs for the theoretical study of specific legal issues along with practice activities such as mock trials;

The Massimo Baldini School of Journalism offers two-year programs that require enrollment in the journalism trainee program. At the end of the course (taught by professional journalists, academics and technical specialists), the university confers a diploma.

Corporate placement and campus drive 
LUISS provides a wide network of corporate placement opportunities for its students and recently collaborated internationally for exploring students dynamics for international experience. The first collaboration took place in December 2021 with TreeAndHumanKnot RisingIndia Think-tank.

Campuses 

LUISS Guido Carli currently has five campuses in Rome.

The historic campus is situated at Viale Pola 12 (in the 1930s, this was the residence of Galeazzo Ciano and Edda Mussolini), which is referred to in most of the documents that mention the university. It continues to house the university's general management, administrative services, human resources and academic support services. Also at this location are master's degrees, the School of Journalism and the Specialized School for the Legal Professions, as well as the Luiss Business School and LUISS University Press.

The Viale Romania campus opened in October 2007 at Viale Romania 32, in the heart of the Parioli quarter in Rome. This campus has the largest number of buildings and students even though it has not yet been completed: in fact only the first 9,420 m² out of the 28,000 m² planned are currently being used. This campus (converted from a former school entirely redesigned as a university campus) houses the Departments of Business and Management, Economics and Finance, and Political Science, the Student Office, the Orientation office, the Placement Office, Teaching and Research, International Relations and IT.

The Department of Law is located at Via Parenzo 11, which is not far from the historic campus of Viale Pola. The building was originally a hospital for blind war veterans (commemorated by a marble plaque inside the building). In the 1990s, Confindustria decided to take over the structure, restoring the original plan and shape of the building while completely renovating the interior. The building was designed by Pietro Aschieri in 1929-1931 and renovated by Studio Passarelli 1990-93. Substantial parts of the interior were renovated to their original design.

The newest Luiss campus is Villa Blanc, home to the LUISS Business School, at Via Nomentana 216. The campus was inaugurated in June 2018.

There is also the campus located at Via di S.Costanza, which houses a library that specializes in the economic, legal, political and social sciences. The Library has over 100,000 books, 1,800 journals and 80 databases.

Administration

Presidents 
 , from the university's founding to October 31, 1975 ("Pro Deo" and "Luiss")
 Carlo Ferrero, from November 1, 1975, to October 31, 1978 
 Guido Carli, from November 1, 1978, to April 23, 1993
 Luigi Abete, from November 1, 1993, to July 18, 2001
 Antonio D'Amato, from July 18, 2001, to December 20, 2004
 Luca Cordero di Montezemolo, from December 20, 2004, to July 15, 2010
 Emma Marcegaglia, from July 16, 2010
 Vincenzo Boccia, from June 19, 2019

Rectors 
 Roberto Lucifredi, from November 1, 1966, to July 27, 1974 ("Pro Deo")
 Giuseppe Mira, from November 1, 1974, to October 31, 1977 ("Pro Deo" and "Luiss")
 Rosario Romeo, from November 1, 1978, to July 16, 1984 ("Luiss")
 Carlo Scognamiglio, from November 1, 1984, to June 18, 1992
 Mario Arcelli, from July 16, 1992, to September 30, 2002
 Adriano De Maio, from October 1, 2002, to June 16, 2005
 Marcello Foschini, from June 16, 2005, to September 30, 2006
 Massimo Egidi, from October 1, 2006, to October 3, 2016
 Paola Severino, from October 3, 2016, to June 18, 2018
 Andrea Prencipe, from June 18, 2018

General Managers 
 Pier Luigi Celli, from May 1, 2005, to July 14, 2013
 Giovanni Lo Storto, from July 15, 2013

Other figures

Deans of departments 
 Antonio Nuzzo (Dean of the Department of Law)
 Stefano Manzocchi (Dean of the Department of Economics and Finance)
 Alessandro Zattoni (Dean of the Department of Business and Management)
 Roberto D'Alimonte (Dean of the Department of Political Science)

Faculty (former and current) 
 Glauco Benigni (Author, journalist, former Head of International Press Rai International)
 Francesco Giorgino (RAI Conductor)
 Giuliano Amato (jurist, politician, former Prime Minister of Italy)
 Dario Antiseri (philosopher)
 Daniele Archibugi (economist)
 Fabiano Schivardi (economist)
 Fabrizio Cacciafesta (mathematician)
 Matteo Arpe (banker, former CEO of Capitalia)
 Antonio Baldassarre (former President of the Constitutional Court of Italy, President of SISAL and RAI)
Giuseppe Conte (former Prime Minister of Italy)
 Vincenzo Caianiello (former President of the Constitutional Court of Italy, jurist, magistrate and politician)
 Lucio Caracciolo (geopolitical analyst)
 Antonio Catricalà (jurist)
 Pier Luigi Celli (writer, entrepreneur, manager)
 Fulvio Conti (CEO and general manager of ENEL)
 Roberto D'Alimonte (political analyst)
 Vincenzo Fagiolo (cardinal)
 Fabio Fortuna (economist)
 Augusto Fantozzi (former Minister of Finance)
 Domenico Fisichella (political analyst, then Senator, Minister of Culture, Vice President of the Senate)
 Giovanni Maria Flick (former President of the Constitutional Court of Italy)
 Franco Fontana (President of Cassa di Risparmio della Provincia dell'Aquila and chairman of the board of Statutory Auditors at ENEL)
 Enrico Giovannini (economist, statistician and former Minister of Labour)
 David Held (political analyst, philosopher)
 Antonio Martino (economist, politician, Minister of Foreign Affairs and Minister of Defense)
 Daniele Mastrogiacomo (journalist)
 Giuseppe Mazzei (journalist)
 Carlo Mezzanotte (Vice President Emeritus of the Constitutional Court of Italy)
 Andrea Monorchio (economist and accountant general of the State)
 Fiamma Nirenstein (journalist and politician)
 Giovanni Orsina (historian, scientific editor of the Luigi Einaudi Foundation, Rome)
 Alessandro Pajno (magistrate, President of the Council of State)
 Luciano Pellicani (sociologist and journalist)
 Pietro Perlingieri (jurist and university professor)
 Mario Pescante (entrepreneur and politician)
 Roberto Pessi (labor law expert and lawyer)
 Francesco Pizzetti (jurist, President of the Authority to Guarantee Privacy)
 Gianni Profita (economist)
 Gaetano Quagliariello (politician, former Minister for Constitutional Reform)
 Giuseppe Pizza (politician and Undersecretary of Public Education, Universities and Scientific Research)
 Pietro Reichlin (economist, brother of Lucrezia Reichlin)
 Gian Luigi Rondi (critic)
 Giuseppe Sacco (economist, columnist)
 Paolo Savona (economist, former Minister of Industry, President of Unicredit Bank of Rome)
 Carlo Scognamiglio (former President of the Senate, Minister of Defense, Honorary President of the Italian Aspen Institute and of the Rizzoli-Corriere della Sera publishing group)
 Vincenzo Scotti (politician, Minister of the Interior and Undersecretary of Foreign Affairs)
 Paola Severino (jurist, former Minister of Justice)
 Chicco Testa (entrepreneur)
 Sergio Vento (diplomat)
 Vincenzo Visco (former Minister of Finance and Vice Minister of Economy)
 Victor Zaslavsky (historian)

Alumni 
 Elisabetta Belloni (Secretary General of the Ministry of Foreign Affairs)
 Rosy Bindi (politician)
 Concetta Brescia Morra (professor of Law, member of the SSM Administrative Board of Review)
 Daniele Capezzone (politician)
 Annagrazia Calabria (politician)
 Fabio Caressa (journalist)
 Lorenzo Cesa (politician)
 Giovanni Chiodi (politician)
 Ranieri de Marchis (Head of Internal Audit at UniCredit)
 Giovanni Floris (journalist)
 Gerardo Greco (journalist)
 Giulia Innocenzi (journalist)
 Maurizio Lauri (Chairman of the Board of Statutory Auditors at UniCredit)
 Giampiero Massolo (Ambassador, President of Fincantieri, former General Secretary of the Ministry of Foreign Affairs)
Antonio Mele (economist)
 Carlo Messina (CEO of Intesa Sanpaolo)
 Massimo Moratti (CEO of Saras S.p.A.)
 Marco Nori (CEO of Isolfin)
Marco Furore (politician, MEP)
Nicola Ottaviani (politician, mayor of Frosinone)
Elio Leoni Sceti (businessman)
Alessandro Cardelli (Capitan Regent of the Republic of San Marino)
Alessandro Battilocchio (politician)
 Fabio Panetta (Deputy Governor of Banca d'Italia, member of the SSM Supervisory Board)
 Roberto Speranza (politician, current Minister of Health)
 Riccardo Zacconi (CEO of King)
 Luca Maestri (CFO of Apple Inc.)
Paljin Tulku Rinpoche
 Princess Victoria Romanovna (businesswoman)

See also 
 List of Italian universities
 List of business schools in Europe
 Rome

References

External links
 

 
Educational institutions established in 1974
Mass media in Rome
1974 establishments in Italy
Rome Q. XVII Trieste